Cloyne Cave is a cave located near the town of Cloyne, County Cork, Ireland. It is the longest cave in County Cork.

Description 
The cave has been known of for thousands of years and lends its name to the town itself. The name Cloyne is taken from  meaning Cave of the meadow.

The cave largely consists of phreatic mazes formed along weaknesses in the jointing of the limestone rocks. The exact length of the cave is unknown as the cave has yet to be fully surveyed, despite several years of continuous surveying in the early 1980s by local cavers. Estimates have ranged from 2.5 km to 7 km. A further system of unexplored caves has been known to exist under the town itself, since a section of the main street collapsed into a cavern in the mid-20th century.

The cave is very difficult to explore due to the confusing nature of the mazes. People have been said to have been lost in the cave for two days.

External links 
 Description of cave
 Caving trip to Cloyne Cave

Limestone caves
Caves of the Republic of Ireland
Protected areas of County Cork